Tosunpınar is a village in the Kozluk District, Batman Province, Turkey. Its population is 597 (2021).

The hamlets of Armağan, Derincik and İncirli are attached to the village.

References

Villages in Kozluk District

Kurdish settlements in Batman Province